Independence Lake is an alpine lake in Pitkin County, Colorado, United States, located high in the Sawatch Range in the Hunter-Fryingpan Wilderness of White River National Forest. It is the source of the Roaring Fork River and is located south and over a pass from Lost Man Lake and north of Twining Peak.  The lake is accessible via a trail from State Highway 82 west of Independence Pass.

References

Lakes of Colorado
Lakes of Pitkin County, Colorado
Glacial lakes of the United States